Roger Thomas Severino is an American attorney who served as the director of the Office of Civil Rights (OCR) at the United States Department of Health and Human Services from 2017 to 2021. He is currently a Senior Fellow at the Ethics and Public Policy Center.

Early life and education 
Severino, the son of immigrants from Colombia, was raised in Los Angeles. He received a bachelor’s degree in business from University of Southern California, a Master of Public Administration from Carnegie Mellon University, and a Juris Doctor from Harvard Law School.

Career 
From 2008 to 2015, Severino was a trial attorney in the United States Department of Justice Civil Rights Division. Severino was also previously CEO and counsel for the Becket Fund for Religious Liberty, a nonprofit law firm taking on cases related to freedom of religion. In 2015, Severino joined The Heritage Foundation, a conservative think tank geared towards public policy. There, he served as the Director of the DeVos Center for Religion and Civil Society at The Heritage Foundation. Severino has written several opinion columns for The Daily Signal. Severino has also written for Public Discourse: Ethics, Law, and the Common Good, a journal published by Witherspoon Institute, a conservative think-tank.

Department of Health and Human Services 
In March 2017, Severino was appointed as Director of the Office for Civil Rights at the U.S. Department of Health and Human Services by President Donald Trump. He left the position on January 15, 2021.

A social conservative and devout Catholic, Severino has often been criticized for being anti-LGBT. The Human Rights Campaign has described Severino as a "radical anti-LGBTQ activist." In 2018, Severino called the Obama administration's expansion of sex to include gender identity "radical gender ideology." In an op-ed co-written by former U.S. Senator Jim DeMint, Severino said that "transgender rights supporters see sex as 'merely a placeholder’ assigned at birth."

As director of the HHS Office for Civil Rights, Severino was instrumental in the removal of nondiscrimination protections for LGBTQ people established in the Patient Protection and Affordable Care Act. The removal of the provision will allow healthcare providers to deny care based on a patient's sexuality or gender identity.

In July 2020, President Trump nominated Severino a three-year Council position on the Administrative Conference of the United States. Severino was commissioned in January 2021, in the final days of Trump's presidency, and in February, filed a lawsuit in federal court claiming the Biden administration offered him an ultimatum to resign or be terminated.

Personal life 
Since 2004 Severino has been married to Carrie Severino (née Campbell), an attorney and activist who leads the Judicial Crisis Network.

See also 
 Catholic theology of sexuality

References 

United States Department of Health and Human Services officials
Trump administration personnel
Living people
Year of birth missing (living people)
University of Southern California alumni
Carnegie Mellon University alumni
Harvard Law School alumni
American civil rights lawyers
American chief executives
The Heritage Foundation
American people of Colombian descent
Lawyers from Los Angeles
Ethics and Public Policy Center